Iain Finlay (born 21 October 1935) is an Australian author, journalist, television host, and humanitarian. He is known for his work as a foreign correspondent for ABC News.

Early life 
Finlay was born in Canberra in 1935.

Career 
One of Finlay's earliest jobs was reporting for the United Press during the Melbourne Olympic Games in 1956.

He cofounded and hosted the science and technology television series Beyond 2000. He was a presenter on the ABC current affairs radio program PM, and also hosted This Day Tonight.   He has written both fiction and non-fiction books. 

Finlay has reported all over the world and has visited more than 100 countries. He was named the 2017 Australia Day ambassador.

Personal life 
Finlay and Trish Clark have two children together and live in Tweed. Together, they work on humanitarian and education initiatives in Asia, including building a primary school in Laos.

Bibliography
 The Azanian Assignment (novel)
 Africa Overland: A Trek from Cape Town to Cairo with Trish Sheppard
 South America Overland: From New York to Tierra Del Fuego with Trish Sheppard
 Across the South Pacific: Island-hopping from Santiago to Sydney with Trish Sheppard
 Good Morning Hanoi - a year of radio in Vietnam with Trish Clark
 Savage Jungle - An epic struggle for survival, Simon & Schuster, Sydney, 1991

References

1935 births
Living people
Australian non-fiction writers